Charles Augins is an American actor, dancer and choreographer for stage and screen.

A native of Virginia, in 1981 Augins choreographed Ray Davies' first musical Chorus Girls, at the Theatre Royal, Stratford East, London, as well as appearing in Blake's 7 the same year. He won the Laurence Olivier Award for Best Theatre Choreographer in 1991 for Five Guys Named Moe. He had a small role in Revenge of the Pink Panther as "Vic Vancouver". He is probably best known to television audiences for playing "Queeg 500" in an episode of Red Dwarf. He was also the choreographer for the Red Dwarf "Tongue Tied" dance scene in the episode "Parallel Universe". He choreographed for the movie Labyrinth, as well as voicing one of the puppets. In 1989 he appeared as himself in the Jeff Goldblum comedy film The Tall Guy, directed by Mel Smith.

In addition, he has worked as a singer, performing backing vocals on records by artists such as Amii Stewart and releasing a solo single, a cover of the Holland-Dozier-Holland composition "Baby I Need Your Loving" in 1982.

He currently serves as Chair of the Dance Department of Duke Ellington School of the Arts in Washington DC.

References

External links
 
 

Year of birth missing (living people)
Living people
Modern dancers
Laurence Olivier Award winners